Kingsley Madu (born 12 December 1995) is a Nigerian footballer who plays as a left-back for AS Trenčín in the Slovak Fortuna Liga. He was a member of the Nigerian national team.

Club career 
He started at El-Kanemi Warriors F.C. On 13 January 2014 Madu signed with Moses Simon a three-year contract with the Slovakian club AS Trenčín. on 30 August 2016 he signed a three-year contract with Zulte Waregem.

On 21 August 2019, Madu joined Danish Superliga club Odense on a one-year contract. Madu was released by Odense on 22 May 2020, having only made one appearance for the club.

International career
He was selected by Nigeria for their 35-man provisional squad for the 2016 Summer Olympics.

Honours

Club
AS Trenčín
Fortuna Liga: 2014–15, 2015–16
Slovnaft Cup: 2014–15, 2015–16

Zulte Waregem
 Belgian Cup: 2017

International
Nigeria
Olympic Bronze Medal: 2016

References

External links

 
 
 
 
  
 
 

1995 births
Living people
Nigerian footballers
Nigerian expatriate footballers
Nigeria international footballers
Nigeria under-20 international footballers
Association football defenders
AS Trenčín players
Slovak Super Liga players
S.V. Zulte Waregem players
K.S.V. Roeselare players
Odense Boldklub players
Belgian Pro League players
Challenger Pro League players
Danish Superliga players
Footballers at the 2016 Summer Olympics
Olympic footballers of Nigeria
Medalists at the 2016 Summer Olympics
Olympic bronze medalists for Nigeria
Olympic medalists in football
Expatriate footballers in Slovakia
Expatriate footballers in Belgium
Expatriate men's footballers in Denmark
Nigerian expatriate sportspeople in Slovakia
Nigerian expatriate sportspeople in Belgium
Nigerian expatriate sportspeople in Denmark
El-Kanemi Warriors F.C. players
Sportspeople from Kaduna